Vladislav Alekseyevich Shitov (born 7 May 2003) is a Russian football player who plays as a centre-forward for PFC Krylia Sovetov Samara.

Club career
He made his debut in the Russian Football National League for FC Spartak-2 Moscow on 22 August 2020 in a game against FC Irtysh Omsk. He was substituted in at the 60th minute and scored twice in the remaining half-hour.

He made his Russian Premier League debut for FC Spartak Moscow on 13 December 2021 against PFC Sochi.

On 15 July 2022, Shitov joined PFC Krylia Sovetov Samara on a season-long loan. On 23 February 2023, Krylia Sovetov bought out his rights from Spartak and signed a 3.5-year contract with Shitov.

Personal life
His twin brother Vitali Shitov is also football player.

Career statistics

References

External links
 
 
 Profile by Russian Football National League

2003 births
Footballers from Yaroslavl
Living people
Russian footballers
Russia youth international footballers
Russia under-21 international footballers
Association football forwards
FC Spartak-2 Moscow players
FC Spartak Moscow players
PFC Krylia Sovetov Samara players
Russian First League players
Russian Premier League players